"" (The morning star is risen) is an Advent song and Christmas carol with lyrics by Lutheran minister Daniel Rumpius (or Rump), published first in 1587. The common melody by Michael Praetorius appeared later in 1609. It was reprinted, slightly revised by Otto Riethmüller in 1932, and is part of the current Protestant hymnal Evangelisches Gesangbuch and other song books.

History 
Rumpius, a Lutheran minister in Stepenitz, published the song in seven stanzas in 1587 in his  (Song booklet, containing doctrine, consolation, admonition, confession, request, prayers, intercessions, thanksgiving etc.). He placed it in a section for Advent, titled , which indicates that he understood Advent as a time of repentance in preparation of Christmas, and that he wrote it as an occasional song for a sick widow in distress ("kranckn betrübten Witwe").

Rump adapted the song from a secular song in Low German, a Tagelied, or wake-up-call for lovers after a night spent together. He followed the model closely in the first two stanzas. Rump introduced angels in the first stanza, to connect the call to Christmas. It is closed with a praise of the morning star as a symbol of Jesus.

The song appeared in 1925 in a collection by Wilhelm Witzke,  (Sixty selected German folk songs). Otto Riethmüller published it in 1932 as an Advent song, changing the last line of the second stanza to connect the song to the metaphoric equation of Jesus as the Bridegroom, found in "" based on the Song of Songs.

The song was included, using four stanzas, in the Protestant hymnal Evangelisches Kirchengesangbuch in the regional part for Hesse and Nassau. This version was made part of the current hymnal Evangelisches Gesangbuch in the common section as EG 69. It is associated with Epiphany, understanding the morning star as the star of Bethlehem. The hymn is contained in several other song books.

Text 
Rump took a folk song in Low German as a model. He wrote his lyrics in six stanzas of four lines each. Four of them became part of the hymnal Evangelisches Gesangbuch:

Melody 
The melody in use today appeared in the collection Musae Sioniae by Michael Praetorius in 1609. It has been set by composers such as Siegfried Strohbach and Magdalene Schauss-Flake.

See also
 List of Christmas carols

References

External links 
 Der Morgenstern ist aufgedrungen Liederdatenbank
 11.01.2013 / Lied der Woche / "Der Morgenstern ist aufgedrungen" ERF 2013

Advent songs
German-language Christmas carols
1587 works
Lutheran hymns
16th-century hymns in German